Welshman Ncube (born 7 July 1961) is a Zimbabwean lawyer, businessman and politician. He is the founding MDC leader and former President of Zimbabwean political party Movement for Democratic Change – Ncube. He currently serves within the Citizen Coalition for Change (CCC).  He is a practicing lawyer in the firm Mathonsi Ncube Law Chambers, where he is the senior partner at their Bulawayo offices. He also runs a number of business ventures, including a farm in the Midlands Province.

Background

He served as a member of the House of Assembly of Zimbabwe for 13 years, from 2000 -2013 and as Minister for Commerce and Industry from 2009 to 2013.

A lecturer in civil rights at the University of Zimbabwe Faculty of Law, his alma mater, Ncube gained prominence in 1992 when appointed as a professor at the young age of 31. He became one of the founding members of the MDC.

Ncube was instrumental, in the Global Political Agreement negotiations that led to the formation of what was known as the Zimbabwean Government of National Unity (GNU). He was appointed as the Minister of Industry and Commerce in this administration, and he chaired the COMESA Council of Ministers.

Early life 
Ncube was born on 7 July 1961 in Gwelo, Rhodesia. The fourth child of eight, he was raised in the rural Maboleni district by his peasant parents. At school, he did well academically and in sporting pursuits such as athletics and football.

Religion 
Ncube grew up under the mentorship of local Seventh-day Adventist pastor Loyiso Ndlovu, and he followed the teachings of "Prophetess" Ellen G White. In 2012 when Ted Wilson, the president of the Seventh Day Adventists, came to Zimbabwe, he was welcomed by Ncube at Bourbafields stadium in Bulawayo.

Education 
Ncube attended Mzilikazi High School in Bulawayo, where he graduated with straight 'A's. He gained LLB and MPhil Law degrees from the University of Zimbabwe. His MPhil thesis was on Zimbabwean Customary Law, focusing on Family Law.

Early political activity 
Ncube served as the Youth Chairman of Zimbabwe African People's Union (ZAPU), while still a university student. During this period, he became acquainted with Communism and he adopted the precepts of Marxism-Leninism.  His leftward leanings morphed into more moderate beliefs over time, and he now prefers a socialist economy to a centralised Marxist economy.

Legal career 
Ncube taught laws at the University of Zimbabwe, the nation's largest university, from 1985 until 2000.  At age 31, he was promoted to the position of professor. This led to him becoming one of the youngest at the university. At UZ he also served in various key positions which included Proctor (1986- 1995); Senior Proctor (1996- 2000); Chairman Research Board, Chairman of the Department of Private Law (1988-1996); member of the Staff Development Committee (1989-1994), and Member of the UZ Senate (1988-2000).

During his academic years Ncube was visiting professor and scholar to various universities, which included the University of The North West (SA); University of Oslo (Norway), and Stanford University (USA). He was also an external examiner at several universities, including University of Botswana (1997- 1999); University of Swaziland (1998-1999), and University of Namibia (1995- 2000). Ncube is the author of numerous scholarly articles and books, and he has also edited various books and journals. Ncube was a member of the Law Development Commission of Zimbabwe (1988-1996) and the Provisional Council of Legal Education (2003- 2008).

Ncube did various consultant work in a wide range of subject areas (Land law, children's rights, constitutional law, natural resources and environmental law, Women's law, Human rights law, Tax law and security legislation) and for a number of organizations, which included various government ministries, Red Barna, USAID, and NORAD.

During his years at UZ and afterwards, he also practiced as an advocate at the Advocates Chambers in Harare until he became a Minister of Government in February 2009. After the dissolution of the Inclusive Government, Ncube went back into legal practice. He is part of the Mathonsi Ncube Law Chambers firm, where he is the senior partner at the firm's Bulawayo offices.

ZEXCOM Foundation Fund Limited Case 

Original Article published on Nehanda Radio

In 2015 Ncube got involved in a case that concerned some War Veterans in Bulawayo. His client won the case which ultimately angered the War Veterans who resorted to physical violence wanting to assault Ncube. He had to sneak out of the Bulawayo High Court through a back door with the help of police following threats by the group of war veterans who had lost a case.

The group, comprising about 30 ZEXCOM Foundation Fund Limited shareholders, caused a scene at the High Court soon after they lost a case against Barbra Lunga, the company’s liquidator, in the fight over the control of company properties.

Ncube, who was representing Lunga in the matter, was whisked away by police as the irate war veterans stood in front of the court’s main entrance waiting for him to leave the building soon after Justice Francis Bere’s ruling.

The war veterans, led by Jona Gumo Mawire, Shelter Mpofu, Prince Nyepanai Guta and Tongai Samunda, thronged the High Court apparently hoping that the judgment would be in their favor.

"Soon after the ruling, we got out of the courtroom and they (war veterans) confronted me demanding that I give an explanation on why the judge ruled in my client’s favour. I told them to approach their lawyer who apparently had come to court unprepared.

"It looks like their lawyer from Harare wasn't aware of the matter and was only told about it when he had actually visited Bulawayo for a different case at the Labour Court", said Ncube.

The group stood outside the court’s main entrance chanting slogans denouncing Ncube and Lunga. "Welshman (Ncube) isn't a professional lawyer. How can he allow a selfish and greedy person like Barbra to use him for her own ends? We demand to see him so that he explains to us his exact role, failure of which we'll deal with him", said the war veterans.

Ncube and his legal team left the court building after close to an hour holed up inside. They were later driven away in a tinted Isuzu pick up.

Amendment 19 

Amendment No 19 in 2008 paved the way for the implementation of the power-sharing agreement which formed the Government of National Unity, made of ZANU PF, MDC-T and the MDC.

Ncube became the center of Amendment No 19 of the Previous Zimbabwean constitution. This Bill would amend the Constitution in the following principal respects: firstly, to substitute the Chapter on Citizenship by another Chapter making more comprehensive provision on the same topic; secondly, to make specific provision for the appointment and functions of the committee of Parliament known as the Committee on Standing Rules and Orders; thirdly, to provide that the appointment by the President of the chairperson of Zimbabwe Electoral Commission, and of the members of the Anti-Corruption Commission, must be done in consultation with the Committee on Standing Rules and Orders; fourthly to provide for the appointment and functions of a Zimbabwe Media Commission; and finally to make certain transitional amendments pursuant to the agreement between the Presidents of the Zimbabwe African National Union-Patriotic Front (ZANU-PF) and the two formations of the Movement for Democratic Change (MDC), on resolving the challenges facing Zimbabwe, which was signed in Harare on 15 September 2008.

Background 
After the 2002 disputed presidential election the SADC and the Commonwealth advised Zimbabwe to start a dialog to resolve the issues raised by the MDC. Ncube represented the MDC in the talks and Patrick Chinamasa represented ZANU PF. The talks were facilitated by former South African President Kgalema Montlanthe and Professor Adebayo Adedeji of Nigeria. Unreasonable as it seemed, Ncube refused any settlement beyond that of an Inclusive Government. The talks went on for years. When the MDC split, Tendai Biti joined the negotiations as the secretary general of the MDC-T.  After the 2008 electoral crisis, the negotiations between Welshman Ncube, Patrick Chinamasa and Tendai Biti laid ground for new negotiations that formed the Inclusive Government.

Ncube, together with Priscila Misihairabwi –Mushonga (representing MDC) Nicholas Goche and Patrick Chinamasa (ZANU PF), and Tendai Biti and Elton Mangoma (MDC-T) constituted the team of negotiators which negotiated the Global Political Agreement (GPA) under the auspices of the then South African President Thabo Mbeki who was the SADC appointed facilitator to the Zimbabwe political dialogue during 2008. The GPA gave birth to the Inclusive Government. The Inclusive Government became responsible for arresting what was then an unprecedented decline of both politics and economics in Zimbabwe.

Minister of Commerce and Industry 
Ncube became the Minister of Industry and Commerce in the Inclusive Government from February 2009 to July 2013 and in that capacity chaired the COMESA Council of Ministers during 2010 and 2011. He was also the country's representative at the EU ACP Council of Ministers during his stint in government. He also served in the SADC Council of Ministers and the SADC, COMESA and EAC Tripartite Council of Ministers.

Distressed and Marginalized Areas Fund (Dimaf) 
In his capacity as the Minister of Commerce and Industry, Ncube sourced funds amounting to US$40 million from the international community to revitalize distressed companies in marginalized areas. CABS Bank was the government's disbursing partner, out of 60 companies that applied for the fund only 3 received the funding due to tight regulations and rules. Despite Ncube's directive to CABS bank to relax the rules and regulations so that more companies could benefit from the fund, CABS defied his directive and as a result the companies that re-applied still did not meet the minimum requirements. The debate about the fund continued until CABS deposited the money back into government's bank account.

Essar deal 
Ncube signed a deal with Essar Steel that would allow the Indian steel giant to rehabilitate the existing obsolete equipment of Zisco Steel. The success of this deal would provide for over 500 people to be employed. However, the deal failed due to a lack of clearance and consent from other ministries was required. In fear that Ncube would be looked to provide solutions to solve Zimbabwe's high unemployment rate, ZANU PF ministers refused to grant the need clearance. In 2015 the new government reopened negotiations with Essar. The government and Essar Africa Holdings agreed on an improved Zimbabwe Iron and Steel Company (Ziscosteel) deal, providing for a complete overhaul of the company's equipment that has been lying idle for years.

Political career 

Before he was elected President of the MDC in 2011, Ncube had been its Secretary General from 2000 to 2011. He served as a Member of Parliament of Zimbabwe from June 2000 until March 2008. During his time in Parliament he served in various committees including the Standing Orders and Rules Committee and the Parliamentary Legal Committee- which he chaired between 2004 and 2008.

Ncube was very active in civic society where he was founder member of the Zimbabwe Human Rights Association (Zim-Rights); Zimbabwe Lawyers for Human Rights; the National Constitutional Assembly (NCA) where he was the Spokesperson between 1998 and 2000; Women and Law in Southern Africa and Amani Trust.

When Ncube took over the leadership of the MDC in February 2011, his party nominated him to replace Professor Arthur Mutambara as the Deputy Minister in the Inclusive Government. Robert Mugabe refused to swear him in as Deputy Prime Minister.

Ncube ran as his party's presidential candidate in the highly disputed July 2013 harmonized elections and came third after Robert Mugabe and Morgan Tsvangirai.

Ncube has considerable influence in Zimbabwe and among fellow politicians. He is revered for his upfront attitude, negotiation skills, and resourcefulness. His cabinet in the GNU proved popular with the likes of individuals such as David Coltart, who brought much-needed innovation to the Sports and Education Ministry. Using a peaceful non-violent approach to issues, many respect Ncube as a leader with great potential to effect lasting change and lead in a professional, open manner.

According to The Independent, Ncube is perceived by Zimbabwean media to be pro-Mugabe.

Honors
 He has been awarded honorary doctorates from the Faculty of Law, University of Oslo, Norway.

References

1961 births
Living people
Citizens Coalition for Change politicians
People from Gweru
Academic staff of the University of Zimbabwe
Members of the National Assembly of Zimbabwe
Movement for Democratic Change – Mutambara politicians
Government ministers of Zimbabwe
Alumni of Mzilikazi High School
University of Zimbabwe alumni
Northern Ndebele people
20th-century Zimbabwean politicians
21st-century Zimbabwean politicians
Zimbabwean businesspeople
Zimbabwe African People's Union politicians